The 2021 Southern Miss Golden Eagles football team represented the University of Southern Mississippi in the 2021 NCAA Division I FBS football season. The Golden Eagles  played their home games at the M. M. Roberts Stadium in Hattiesburg, Mississippi, and competed in the West Division of Conference USA (CUSA). They were led by first-year head coach Will Hall.

On October 28, 2021, Southern Miss announced that this will be the last season for the team in the C-USA and will join the Sun Belt Conference on July 1, 2022.

Preseason

C-USA media days
The Golden Eagles were predicted to finish in fourth place in the West Division in the Conference USA preseason poll.

Schedule

Personnel

Game summaries

at South Alabama

Grambling State

Troy

at No. 1 Alabama

at Rice

UTEP

UAB

at Middle Tennessee

North Texas

at No. 23 UTSA

at Louisiana Tech

FIU

References

Southern Miss
Southern Miss Golden Eagles football seasons
Southern Mississippi Golden Eagles football